The Forty-Ninth Legislature of the Chamber of Senators of Uruguay is the session of the upper house of the Uruguayan General Assembly from February 15, 2020 to February 15, 2025, during the Presidency of Luis Alberto Lacalle Pou. It meets in Montevideo. Senators were elected in the 2019 general election in a single constituency.

Major events 

 15 February 2020: The Chamber of Senators was chaired by José Mujica as the new vice president had not yet taken office.
 1 March 2020: Vice President Beatriz Argimón, who serves as President of the Senate, took office.
1 April 2020: A bill presented by President Lacalle Pou to soften the economic effects of the COVID-19 pandemic was unanimously approved; Law No. 19,874 created the "Coronavirus Fund".
23 April 2020: A package of measures is presented by the Government through a "law of urgent consideration" to be legislated.
 20 October 2020: Two former Presidents, Julio María Sanguinetti (1980–1985, 1995–2000) and José Mujica (2010–2015) retired from the Senate due to their advanced age.
15 December 2020: The General Assembly met to close the first session of the Legislature.
16 December 2020: Vice President Beatriz Argimón summoned Parliament for a special session to legislate the measures announced by President Lacalle Pou due to the exponential growth of cases of COVID-19.
19 December 2020: The Senate, in an all-night session, approved a law that regulates Article 38 of the Constitution, limiting the right of assembly for 60 days. Closure of the country's border was also legislated, framed in Article 37.

Party summary

Members

References 

General Assembly of Uruguay